Pogonocherus perroudi is a species of beetle in the family Cerambycidae. It was described by Mulsant in 1839. It has a wide distribution between Europe and North Africa. It feeds on several species of Pinus.

Subspecies
 Pogonocherus perroudi brevipilosus Holzschuh, 1993
 Pogonocherus perroudi perroudi Mulsant, 1839

References

Pogonocherini
Beetles described in 1839